Sandemo-serie in Swedish and Norwegian (in English Best Serials by Margit Sandemo; this set of serials has not been translated into English) is a 40-volume series of pulp fiction-novels by author Margit Sandemo. Those novels represent earliest works of Margit Sandemo. They were released in Norwegian women's magazines before year 1982.

Titles 

Novel series
Novels by Margit Sandemo